Michael Lee Morgan (January 31, 1942 – December 2, 1996) was an American football linebacker in the National Football League (NFL) for the Philadelphia Eagles, the Washington Redskins, and the New Orleans Saints.  He played college football at Louisiana State University for the LSU Tigers and was drafted in the 17th round of the 1964 NFL draft.

1942 births
1996 deaths
Players of American football from Shreveport, Louisiana
American football linebackers
LSU Tigers football players
Philadelphia Eagles players
Washington Redskins players
New Orleans Saints players